Wanakena is a hamlet located on the shore of Cranberry Lake in the town of Fine in St. Lawrence County, New York, United States.  Tourism is a major industry in the area; a small year-round population is supplemented by an influx seasonal residents each summer.  It is the location of the SUNY-ESF Ranger School.

History
The town was founded in 1902 by cousins Herbert and Horace Rich, founders of the Rich Brothers Lumber Company. Rich Lumber purchased  on the southwestern shore of Cranberry Lake, and constructed several mills to work the lumber. Housing for the millworkers was built in part from lumber salvaged from the company's abandoned Pennsylvania lumber operation with many of these homes still in existence. At the height of lumbering & milling activities in Wanakena (1902-1912) there were up to 1500 workers at the Rich Brothers mill and associated industries. Prior to leaving the deforested area, Rich Lumber Company donated land to Syracuse University to start the first school in the nation to educate forest rangers and to encourage sustainable forestry practices with the first school built in 1912. The Environmental School of Forestry is now part of SUNY and is the oldest Ranger School / School of Forestry in the country.

A logging railroad was constructed connecting Wanakena to the Carthage and Adirondack Railroad at Benson Mines, starting operation in 1905. After the lumber industry left the area, the rails were dismantled because  of a significant decrease in people traveling to and from Wanakena.

A suspension footbridge built over the Oswegatchie River before 1903 connected the hamlet and the mills for company workers and was one of  the longest suspension foot bridges in the United States. The footbridge had been listed on the National Register of Historic Places prior to being destroyed by an ice jam on January 14, 2014. Community efforts began immediately to rebuild the bridge with over $130,000 raised as of May 2016. Several grants and donations by local Foundations were used with the donated money for a matching grant from the New York State Office of Parks, Recreation and Historic Places. Reconstruction of the bridge was completed in November 2016. The Wanakena Presbyterian Church is also listed on the National Register of Historic Places.

The Wanakena Historical Association developed a historical walking tour (2002) that includes two kiosks and six picture stations that display historical pictures and narratives on the history of the hamlet, logging, milling, railroad, and tourism. The walking tour is visited annually by schools, bus tours and tourists. The walking tour is free and open to the public from May 30 to at least Labor Day.

Today there still is a vibrant community in this little pioneer village on the Oswegatchie River. In addition to the SUNY ESF school, the church has weekly services during the summer (9:15am), post-office, a store and art gallery called Otto's Abode, Packbasket Adventures Lodge and Guide Service, the Otto J Hamele Historic Walking Tour, a gazebo where weekly summer concerts are held, and Black Waters Cafe and Trading Post. The Wanakena History Center opened in 2021 to universal acclaim.On August 21, the atmosphere was festive, and anticipation was palpable in the air. A steady stream of visitors kept the volunteers busy . The HC was open from 10am to 4pm, with the dedication, which was very well attended at 1pm. In addition, there was an unveiling of an historic sign at noon commemorating the founding of the Ranger School in 1912. The sign was paid for by a grant from the Pomeroy Foundation in Syracuse.

References

External links
Google books:  Smeby, Susan Thomas, Cranberry Lake and Wanakena
NY Route 30 - Wanakena
Town of Fine, NY
SUNY-ESF Ranger School
Early Fine history
Otto's Abode

Adirondacks
Hamlets in St. Lawrence County, New York
Hamlets in New York (state)